Guardians of the Globe are a fictional superhero team in the Image Universe, appearing primarily in the comic, and further Amazon Prime series, Invincible. The original team was based on DC Comics' Justice League of America.

Fictional team history

Guardians of the Globe I
The original Guardians of the Globe was a private organization funded by War Woman and Darkwing. This version of the Guardians was a pastiche of DC Comics' Justice League of America (JLA), with each of the Guardians (except Black Samson) having an obvious JLA analog. Robert Kirkman, in his author notes for Invincible: The Ultimate Collection, Volume 1, explains that he went with these archetypes because he had only 18 pages to get the reader to care for the characters before their brutal deaths.

Along with Black Samson (who is in part based on Doc Samson, but mostly on Iron Man), the team included: Darkwing (based on Batman); the Immortal (based on Superman along with elements of Vandal Savage); War Woman (based on Wonder Woman, with elements of Thor); a Russian named Red Rush (based on the Flash); Aquarius, the King of Atlantis (based on Aquaman); Martian Man (based on the Martian Manhunter); and the Green Ghost (based on Green Lantern). Omni-Man (who is also based on Superman) was a trusted associate of the Guardians, and knew the location and password of the Guardians secret headquarters in Utah, although he was never an official member of the team (unlike Superman). This trust let Omni-Man betray and murder the Guardians, after calling them to their headquarters on an emergency. He smashed Aquarius's and Red Rush's faces together, beheaded Green Ghost, snapped War Woman's neck, disemboweled Martian Man, and impaled Darkwing. Before getting beheaded, Immortal noted to Omni-Man that he never liked him. After beheading Immortal, Omni-Man quotes "the feeling was mutual".

The only member of the Guardians to survive the massacre was Black Samson, who was not an active member at that time (due to the loss of his powers). The Immortal subsequently returns to life due to the nature of his power.

Guardians of the Globe II
After the murder of the original team, the United States government re-established the Guardians of the Globe as a state-funded agency. This new team was led by former Teen Team leader Robot, under the direct supervision of Donald, the government's superhuman liaison. Donald was ultimately responsible to Cecil Stedman. Along with Robot, the initial lineup for the new team included Dupli-Kate and Rex Splode from the Teen Team, Monster Girl, Shrinking Ray, and Black Samson, the only surviving member of the old team.

The new team's performance in its first few months did not live up to the expectations of its superiors, leading Donald and Cecil to make some changes. Bulletproof was added to the team's roster, and the newly resurrected Immortal was brought in as a consultant to improve standards. After the team continued to under-perform, the Immortal replaced Robot as team leader.

Although not a member (Robot said he was always welcome if he became interested), Invincible reports to the same agency and often helps the team in dire circumstances.

When most of the Guardians' most powerful members were sent into space to thwart a Martian invasion, they were successful, but while they were away, the team's weaker members were required to stop the Lizard League's plot to take command of nuclear warheads. Dupli-Kate and Shrinking Ray were killed by the villain Komodo Dragon; Rex Splode was badly injured in the fight, but survived.

After lashing out at Allen the Alien (who was only looking for Invincible), the Immortal realized just how deeply he had been affected by Dupli-Kate's death and resigned from the Guardians. However, it was revealed that Dupli-Kate was still alive, as she always left her "Zero" behind on missions.

Parody team and miniseries
In March 2010, Image began releasing teaser posters, announcing members of a new Guardians of the Globe team as a parody of Marvel's advertisements for the line-ups of their revamped Avengers, New Avengers, Secret Avengers and Avengers Academy books. In order of appearance, the released posters were:
 Invincible from Invincible
 Spawn from Spawn 
 Rick Grimes from The Walking Dead 
 U.S. President Barack Obama
 Gary Potter, a parody of Harry Potter

In an interview with Comic Book Resources, Kirkman explained that although the later images were deliberately farcical, the campaign was intended to announce a six-issue miniseries spinning out of Invincible.  The miniseries, he said, would deal with the earthbound characters of the Invincible universe, while that title focused on "The Viltrumite War", an eight-issue storyline that would be set solely in space. The six-issue series, named Guarding the Globe, was launched on August 25, 2010. The Parody Team was featured in a one-page backup in the first issue.

Image released teaser images of the team's real members done in the same style as the parody images. In order appearance, This set of posters were:
 Brit from Brit 
 Outrun 
 Kaboomerang 
 Yeti 
 Bulletproof 

Outrun, Kaboomerang, and Yeti are all new characters created for the series. Issue three of the new bimonthly miniseries also introduced El Chupacabra from Mexico, a washed-up superhero who is an alcoholic with razor-sharp claws and other abilities. In issue four, seven additional new characters are added.

Japandroid
A little android girl from Japan.
Cast Iron
A metal-skinned man from Yugoslavia.
Knockout
A boxing heroine from the United States of America. Formerly a Capes, Inc. character.
Best Tiger
A blindfolded gunman from the People's Republic of China.
Le Brusier
A French bulldog from France.
Kid Thor
A mallet-wielding strongman from Canada, also formerly from Capes, Inc.
Pegasus
A winged woman from Russia.

Currently most of the surviving members of the Guardians of the Globe are the prisoners of Robot, who has established a secret world dictatorship with himself as the head.

In Robot's initial attack, Black Samson was killed in his barbershop. Knockout was killed by a Robot drone after attempting to revive her husband Kid Thor, who had been reduced to a desiccated corpse due to a Robot Drone blasting his hammer free of his grasp. Kid Thor had previously been shown to need to hold his hammer at all times to allow it to keep him alive. Knockout retrieved Kid Thor's hammer and placed it in his remaining hand. Kid Thor reanimated just in time to see Knockout decapitated by a Robot Drone. Kid Thor attacked the drone, but his hammer was swiftly destroyed by the drone implying that Kid Thor died as well. Pegasus managed to escape the initial attack while flying a wounded Yeti to safety.

However, Brit, Outrun, Kaboomarang, Le Brusier, Pegasus and Yeti were all later captured by Robot's drones following Bulletproof's betrayal of the remaining Guardians in exchange for his freedom.

Of the Guardians present, only Best Tiger escaped. The Immortal and Dupli-Kate remain free and in hiding, attempting to foster a rebellion against Robot.

In other media
Both incarnations of the Guardians of the Globe appear in the steaming television series Invincible, with the characters voiced by the following actors:

 Immortal, Aquarius and Rudy voiced by Ross Marquand
 War Woman voiced by Lauren Cohan
 A genderbent Green Ghost voiced by Sonequa Martin-Green
 Martian Man voiced by Chad L. Coleman
 Red Rush voiced by Michael Cudlitz
 Darkwing voiced by Lennie James
 Robot voiced by Zachary Quinto
 Rex Splode voiced by Jason Mantzoukas
 Dupli-Kate voiced by Males Jowe
 A genderbent Shrinking Rae and Monster Girl's human form voiced by Grey DeLisle
 Monster Girl's ogre form voiced by Kevin Michael Richardson
 Black Samson voiced by Khary Payton

Just like in the comics, the original incarnation of the Guardians of the Globe (minus Black Samson) were slaughtered by Omni-Man, with Immortal later revived. While the part with Omni-Man killing Immortal and snapping War Woman's neck remains intact, he does different death moves to the other members, like crushing Red Rush's skull, sending his fist through Green Ghost's head, beheading Martian Man, slamming Darkwing's head into the ground, and using War Woman's mace on Aquarius. After their deaths, a second incarnation of the Guardians of the Globe was formed with Invincible, Rudy and Robot, Rex Splode, Dupli-Kate, Shrinking Rae, Monster Girl, and Black Samson.

References

Image Comics superhero teams
Invincible (comic)
Characters created by Robert Kirkman